DZWI (107.9 FM) was a radio station owned and operated by Conamor Broadcasting System.

History
The station was established in 2001 as Power 108. Under the management of 713 Productions, owned by Marcelle John "H-Town" Marcelino, it is the pioneer station in the Philippines and Asia to air an urban contemporary format. Throughout its existence, its studios were located in Mandaluyong. The station and logo took its name from Los Angeles-based Power 106. Days after its broadcast, it gained fame among hip hop enthusiasts around Metro Manila.

Initially automated, the station started having live DJs and special programs months later. Aside from H-Town, notable personalities, known as Power Jocks, included the late rapper Francis Magalona (under his on-air moniker The Mouth), T-Bone (now known as Tony Toni on Magic 89.9's primetime show Boys Night Out) and former MTV Philippines VJ and supermodel Sarah Meier.

On August 31, 2003, Power 108 signed off without any official announcement. With its signal reaching even the northern parts of Metro Manila, it was rumored to be due to its license. A month later, Marcelino and Noveleta mayor Dino Reyes Chua formed Empire Entertainment and took over the operations of 105.9 FM, which was launched on October 20, 2003, as Blazin' 105.9, featuring most of its Power Jocks.

In 2005, the frequency began airing a house music format under the name Underground Radio, which was later shortened to U Radio two years later.

References

External links
Website (outdated)

Power 108 FM
Radio stations established in 2001
Radio stations disestablished in 2003